Monteciccardo is a frazione of Pesaro, and former comune,  in the Province of Pesaro e Urbino in the Italian region Marche, located about  northwest of Ancona and about  southwest of Pesaro. It was a separate comune until 2020.

Monteciccardo borders the following municipalities: Mombaroccio, Montefelcino, Montelabbate, Pesaro, Sant'Angelo in Lizzola, Serrungarina, Urbino.

References

 

Cities and towns in the Marche